Emal Gariwal is an Afghan footballer. He plays as a goalkeeper for Oqaban Hindukush F.C. He has made 3 appearances for the Afghanistan national football team.

External links

Emal Gariwal – Football Lineup's Profile

Afghan footballers
Living people
1984 births
Footballers from Kabul
Association football goalkeepers
Afghanistan international footballers